Michael Underwood (1736–1820) was an English physician and surgeon, born in West Molesey in Surrey. He is a relevant figure in the history of medicine and pediatrics for having given the first known description of several childhood diseases, infantile paralysis and polio included.

Early career 
In 1783, Underwood published his first work, which was about leg ulcers and "in which former methods of treatment were candidly examined and compared, with one more rational and safe, proving that a perfect cure may generally be effected more certainly, without rest and confinement, than by the strict regimen in common use." He included "an introduction on the process of ulceration and the origin of pus laudabile: to which are added hints on a successful method of treating some scrophulous tumors and the mammary abscess and sore nipples of lying-in women."  This work was reviewed in The English Review, where it was written favorably:

Career highlights 
In 1789, he became the first person to give a clinical description of Poliomyelitis, which he referred to as "a debility of the lower extremities." He was later elected a member of the Royal College of Physicians in London.

In 1796, Underwood was chosen as accoucheur at the birth of Princess Charlotte of Wales. In 1801, he fell sick and retired from his profession. That time was economically difficult for him, but, as a religious man, he later "regained its healthy tone, and he was enable to realize the hopes and consolations of the Gospel."

Posthumous publication 
In 1824, a collection of thoughts from his diary was published posthumously for the benefit of his widowed daughter. The full name of this book was Extracts from the Diary of the late Michael Underwood, M.D. consisting of Mediation, Critical and Practical Remarks on various Passages of Scripture, Miscellaneous Essays, and Occasional Hymns. A review from The Literary Chronicle read that:
[It] embraces a period of more than sixty years, during which it was the constant practice of Dr. Underwood to commit to paper the occurrences of each day for his own personal gratification; his domestic circumstances, professional visits, religious impressions, and Christian duties, were all entered as in a day-book without any regard to order or arrangement.

A review of the book in The Monthly Repository described the physician as "a man of sincere and deep piety; his creed was highly Calvinistic." The work was said to be mournful at times, and another review in The London Literary Gazette said that "its author seems to have overshadowed and bewildered his mind by painful metaphysical contemplation of the greatest mysteries of religion; but he displays a Christian, if a too intense, anxiety to arrive at truth and satisfy his soul."
He was buried in Whitefield's Tabernacle, Tottenham Court Road in London.

Works 

 Treatise upon ulcers of the legs, scrophulous sores and mammary abscesses (1783)
 See Surgical tracts, containing a treatise upon ulcers of the legs (1788)
 A Treatise on the Diseases of Children: With Directions for the Management of Infants; (1835), 9th edition with notes by Marshal Hall- (Originally published in 1789)
 Extracts from the diary of the late Michael Underwood, MD (1824)

References

External links 

 Michael Underwood, MD (1737–1820): physician-accoucheur of London.
 Traité sur les maladies des enfans (1803) - (French translation of his  Treatise).
 Tratado sobre las ulceras de las piernas: donde se examinan con sinceridad todos los métodos curativos que hasta ahora se han empleado, y se cotejan con otro mas racional y mas seguro (1791). Manuel González, Gerónimo Muñoz Correa (Spanish Translation of his Treatise]

18th-century English medical doctors
English surgeons
English Christians
Fellows of the Royal College of Physicians
1736 births
1820 deaths
Physician-accoucheurs
People from Molesey